This is an incomplete list of Bien de Interés Cultural landmarks in Cantabria, Spain.

 Bárcena Mayor
 Church of Santa María (Lebeña)
 Colegiata y Claustro de Santa Juliana
 Collegiate church of San Martin de Elines, Cantabria
 Collegiate church of San Pedro de Cervatos
 Comillas Pontifical University
 El Capricho
 Juliobriga
 Mogrovejo
 Palacio de la Magdalena
 Royal Artillery Factory of La Cavada
 Santa Olaja mill
 Santander Cathedral
 Santo Toribio de Liébana

References 

 
Cantabria